Charles Huber may refer to:

 Charles E. Huber (1845–1904), Los Angeles City Council member
 Charles M. Huber (born 1956), German politician and actor